Antonio Campaña (born 24 May 1946) is a Spanish alpine skier. He competed in two events at the 1968 Winter Olympics.

References

1946 births
Living people
Spanish male alpine skiers
Olympic alpine skiers of Spain
Alpine skiers at the 1968 Winter Olympics
Sportspeople from Barcelona
20th-century Spanish people